Alice and Ellen Kessler (born 20 August 1936 in Nerchau, Saxony, Germany) are twin entertainers known in Europe, especially Germany and Italy, from the 1950s and 1960s for their singing, dancing, and acting. They are usually credited as the Kessler Twins (Die Kessler-Zwillinge in Germany and Le Gemelle Kessler in Italy), where they remain popular.

The Kessler sisters enjoyed a significant degree of popularity in the US, appearing on national television programs such as The Ed Sullivan Show. The Kesslers made their American television debut on the CBS variety show, The Red Skelton Hour. They also appeared in the 1963 film Sodom and Gomorrah as dancers and were featured on the cover of Life Magazine that same year.

Their parents, Paul and Elsa, sent them to ballet classes at the age of six, and they joined the Leipzig Opera's child ballet program at age 11. When they were 18, their parents used a visitor's visa to escape to West Germany, where they performed at the Palladium in Düsseldorf. They performed at The Lido in Paris between 1955 and 1960, where they met Elvis Presley, on leave from the Army on June 17, 1959, and represented West Germany in the 1959 Eurovision Song Contest, finishing in 8th place with Heute Abend wollen wir tanzen geh'n (Tonight we want to go dancing).

They moved to Italy in 1960 and gradually moved to more serious roles. They became very popular thanks to the RAI television variety show Studio Uno (1961–1966). At the age of 40, they agreed to pose on the cover of the Italian edition of Playboy. That issue became the fastest-selling Italian Playboy to that date. 

They moved back to Germany in 1986 and live in Grünwald. They have received two awards from both the German and Italian governments for promoting German-Italian cooperation through their work in show business.

Selected filmography
 As Long as There Are Pretty Girls (1955)
 The Beggar Student (1956)
 The Count of Luxemburg (1957)
 The Twins from Zillertal (1957)
 Gräfin Mariza (1958)
  (1960)
 Love and the Frenchwoman (1960)
 Erik the Conqueror (1961)
 The Bird Seller (1962)
 Sodom and Gomorrah (1962)
 Wedding Night in Paradise (1962)
 The Thursday (1963)
 Dead Woman from Beverly Hills (1964)

References

External links 
 
 
 
 Interviewed by the CBC, ca. 1960 (the interview, made while they were employed at The Lido, starts halfway through the clip)
 Kessler Sisters on Scopitone

1936 births
Living people
German child actresses
German women singers
German film actresses
20th-century German actresses
Eurovision Song Contest entrants for Germany
Eurovision Song Contest entrants of 1959
Recipients of the Cross of the Order of Merit of the Federal Republic of Germany
German twins
Identical twin actresses
Twin musical duos
People from Grimma
Actresses from Munich
Identical twin females
Female musical duos
German female dancers